Oak Grove Fork Clackamas River is a  tributary of the Clackamas River in the U.S. state of Oregon. From its headwaters in the Warm Springs Indian Reservation near Abbot Pass in the Cascade Range, the river flows generally west through Mount Hood National Forest in Clackamas County to the unincorporated community of Ripplebrook. Here it enters the main stem of the Clackamas River. Oak Grove Fork feeds Timothy Lake and Lake Harriet, two artificial impoundments built along its course to control water flows to hydroelectric plants.

Course
Originating on the Warm Springs Indian Reservation, the river flows generally west about  through the Mount Hood National Forest to the unincorporated community of Ripplebrook, where it joins the main stem of the Clackamas River.

From its source, the river flows about  through a landform known as Big Meadows before leaving the reservation. Shortly thereafter, it crosses the Pacific Crest Trail, which follows the river from there to Timothy Lake. From here to Ripplebrook, Forest Road 57 follows the river. Campgrounds on the lake shore to the left include Oak Fork, Gone Creek, Hood View, and Pine Point. Meditation Point Campground lies on the opposite shore. The river exits the lake via a spillway  from the mouth.

Lake Harriet Campground lies along the shore to the right. Then the river receives Skunk Creek and Canyon Creek from the right, Butte Creek from the left, and Station Creek and Pint Creek, both from the right, before passing Ripplebrook, Ripplebrook Campground, the Ripplebrook Ranger Station and Heliport, and the southeastern terminus of Oregon Route 224, which all lie to the right.

Discharge
The United States Geological Survey monitors the flow of Oak Grove Fork at two stations, one below Timothy Lake,  from the mouth, and the other above a Portland General Electric (PGE) power plant intake,  from the mouth.

Fishing
The Oak Grove Fork has fishing for Brook trout (Salvelinus fontinalis) close to the Timothy Lake dam, wild coastal cutthroat trout (Oncorhynchus clarki clarkii), and Rainbow trout (Oncorhynchus mykiss irideus) further down, and Brown trout (Salmo trutta) close to Harriet Lake. All species respond well to flies or artificial baits. Only artificial lures and flies allowed on the Oak Grove Fork, with barbless hooks.

Hydroelectric dams
As part of its efforts to generate electricity from water power in the Clackamas River basin, PGE built a dam on the Oak Grove Fork in 1923. The company's power plant at Lake Harriet, created by the dam, began making electricity in 1924. To regulate flows on the Oak Grove Fork and on the mainstem Clackamas River, the company built a dam at Timothy Meadows, upstream of Harriet Lake, in 1956. The new dam formed Timothy Lake, a  impoundment that doubles as a recreation site.

See also 
 List of rivers of Oregon

References

External links
Clackamas River Basin Council

Rivers of Oregon
Rivers of Clackamas County, Oregon